Pherothrinax lamborni is a species of tephritid or fruit flies in the genus Pherothrinax of the family Tephritidae.

Distribution
Malawi.

References

Tephritinae
Insects described in 1935
Diptera of Africa